Pierre Veilletet (2 October 1943 in Momuy (Landes) – 8 January 2013) was a French journalist and writer.

Biography 
From 1968 to 2000, Veilletet worked for the daily French newspaper Sud Ouest, and became their chief reporter in 1973. In 1976 he got France's highest journalism award–the prix Albert-Londres.

He edited the Sunday edition of Sud Ouest from 1979 to 1989, then became editor-in-chief of Sud Ouest until 2000. He also participated in the 1979 launch of a magazine about bullfighting, a subject he was passionate about, Les Cahiers de la corrida.

Pierre Veilletet was president of Reporters Without Borders and has been a member of its board of directors since its inception. He was re-elected in 2007 for a two-year term and on September 30, 2009, Dominique Gerbaud was elected to succeed him. In 2008, he was one of the signatories of the "Appel en faveur d’une charte et d’une instance pour l’éthique et la qualité de l’information" (Call for a charter and a body for ethics and quality of information).

He has written several novels, mostly published by Éditions Arléa which he cofounded along with Catherine and Jean-Claude Guillebaud.

Works 
 1986: La Pension des nonnes (prix François-Mauriac), Arléa
 1988: Mari-Barbola (prix Jacques-Chardonne)
 1989: Bords d’eaux, prix Jean-Jacques-Rousseau
 1991: Querencia & autres lieux sûrs, Arléa, prix Maurice Genevoix (1992)
 L’Entrepôt Lainé à Bordeaux : Valote et Pistre, photographs by Georges Fessy, Éditions du Demi-cercle
 1993: Cœur de père, Arléa
 1996: D’amour et de mort, with Martine Mougin, Aubéron
 1997: Le vin, leçon de choses, Arléa
 1998: Mots et merveilles, Arléa
 Le Cadeau du moine, Arléa
 2002: Le Prix du sang, Arléa
 2005: Aficion, photographs by Michel Dieuzaide, Cairn
 2013: Oui j'ai connu des jours de grâce, Arléa

Festival 
2003 : Jury of the

References

External links 
 Disparition de Pierre Veilletet, écrivain journaliste on Le Monde (15 January 2013)
 Pierre Veilletet, mort d’un grand journaliste on La Croix (10 January 2013)
 La mort de Pierre Veilletet, grand de Bordeaux on Bibliobs (11 January 2013)
 Pierre-Veilletet on the site or Arléa publisher
 Pierre Veilletet : Le journaliste et écrivain est mort à 69 ans... on Pure People (9 January 2013)
 Pierre Veilletet : La pension des nonnes on YouTube 

1943 births
People from Landes (department)
2013 deaths
20th-century French journalists
20th-century French writers
21st-century French writers
Albert Londres Prize recipients